Sohrab Bakhtiarizadeh (born 11 September 1973) is an Iranian football coach and former player. A centre-back, he played for many teams like Esteghlal, Foolad, Saba Qom, Erzurumspor, Estehglal Khuzestan and the Iran national team.

Club career 
He started his professional career with playing for Khuzestani clubs, before moving to Esteghlal FC. After a couple of seasons, he elected to play professionally in Turkish league. The move was far from successful and Sohrab left this club in controversial circumstances.

He returned to Esteghlal soon after. His lack of playing time caused him to be transferred to Foolad. After a season there he moved to Saba Battery. Along with the likes of Ali Daei and Mohammad Navazi, Sohrab won the Hazfi Cup in 2004/05 season and hence qualified for the Asian Champions League.

In August 2007, Bakhtiarzadeh was transferred to the newly formed club Pas Hamedan. He only played one match and had many differences with the club where he left the club and moved to Foolad for the season after and did not play in many matches. He moved to Saba for the season after.

Bakhtiarizadeh endured a major injury, and was out for many games during 2010–11 season.

Club career statistics 

 Assist Goals

International career 
He made his debut for Iran in October 1997 in a World Cup 1998 qualification game against Qatar in Tehran. He was not included in Iran's final squad for the 1998 Fifa World Cup, but he was an on-and-off starter for the national team until 2003, when he lost his spot.
He scored the last goal in the final of WAFF 2000 where Team Melli won the competition.
His brilliant performance in the IPL 2005/06 season was rewarded by a recall to duty after a three-year absence from Team Melli. He appeared in two of Iran's games in the 2006 World Cup, starting against Angola and scoring Iran's only goal in the game. He was called up to the national team again after the World Cup, by new manager Amir Ghalenoei, but did not participate. He has since retired from international football and only participates in club play.

International goals

Managerial statistics

Honours

Club 
Esteghlal
Hazfi Cup: 1999–2000, 2001–02

Saba
Hazfi Cup: 2004–05
Super Cup: 2005

National 
Iran
WAFF Championship: 2000

References

External links 

Sohrab Bakhtiarizadeh at TeamMelli.com

1973 births
Living people
People from Ahvaz
Iranian footballers
Iran international footballers
Association football defenders
Persian Gulf Pro League players
Azadegan League players
Süper Lig players
Foolad FC players
Esteghlal F.C. players
Iranian expatriate footballers
Erzurumspor footballers
Expatriate footballers in Turkey
Iranian expatriate sportspeople in Turkey
Saba players
Pas players
Esteghlal Khuzestan players
2000 AFC Asian Cup players
2006 FIFA World Cup players
Sportspeople from Khuzestan province